Karl Freiherr von Macchio (23 February  1859 – 1 April 1945), was an Austro-Hungarian diplomat active before and during World War I.

Life 
Born in Hermannstadt (now Sibiu) on 23 February 1859 into a noble family originating from Lombardy. After studies in law, he joined the Austro-Hungarian foreign service in 1881 and served in Constantinople, Bucharest, St. Petersburg and Belgrade. 

In 1899, he was appointed to serve as minister at Cetinje and then from 1903 in Athens succeeding Baron Burián von Rajecz, the future Foreign Minister. In 1907, he was a member of the Austro-Hungarian delegation to the Second Hague Peace Conference. In 1908, he was appointed a Privy Councillor (Geheimer Rat). 

In January 1909, Baron von Macchio was appointed by Count Lexa von Aehrenthal, who considered him an "expert in Balkan questions", to serve as Second Section Chief (equivalent to a Head of Political Section) at the Ballhausplatz. He succeeded Baron Müller von Szentgyörgy who had been promoted to First Section Chief (equivalent to an Undersecretary) and would in March 1912 succeed him also in that position. During the July Crisis in 1914, he was therefore one of the closest collaborators of Foreign Minister Count von Berchtold but played a much more marginal role than the chef de cabinet Count von Hoyos and the Second Section Chief Count von Forgách

After the outbreak of war, Baron von Macchio was sent to Rome on 11 August 1914 on a special mission ("in außerordenlicher Mission") to support the embassy as the ambassador, Mérey, was ill. As such he was de facto ambassador with the title "außerordentlicher und bevollmächtigter Botschafter mit Titel und Charakter", although Mérey remained officially in charge. His mission in Rome was to prevent Italy from entering the war on the side of the Entente, but as the autumn passed it became increasingly clear that it was rather a question about delaying than preventing an Italian declaration of war against Austria-Hungary.

In January 1915, Baron von Macchio, supported by the German ambassador at Rome, the former Chancellor Prince von Bülow, sought to persuade Foreign Minister Count Leopold Berchtold|Count Berchtold to cede the Trentino to Italy. As pressure mounted on Count Berchtold to accede in this direction, he was forced by the Hungarian Minister-President Count Tisza and the Chief of the General Staff General Conrad von Hötzendorf to resign.

Following Italy's declaration of war on 23 May 1915, Baron von Macchio returned to Vienna, where he continued in his function as First Section Chief until January 1917. After the war, he worked as a staff member of the Neue Freie Presse, a Viennese newspaper, covering international affairs.

Prince von Bülow and Matthias Erzberger blamed Baron von Macchio for the failure of the negotiations to prevent the entry of Italy into the war, but Baron von Macchio vehemently denied this in his memoirs, basing himself on Italian sources to justify his course of action. 

Baron von Macchio died in Vienna on 1 April 1945.

Notes

Works 
 Wahrheit! Fürst Bülow und ich in Rom, 1914/1915, Vienna, Jung Österreich verlag, 1931.
 'Momentbilder aus der Julikrise 1914', Berliner Monatshefte, no. 14, 1936, pp. 763–788.

References

External links 
 'Macchio Karl Frh. von', Österreichisches Biographisches Lexikon 1815-1950
 'Karl Macchio', Solving Problems Through Force

1859 births
1945 deaths
20th-century Hungarian people
20th-century Austrian people
Austro-Hungarian diplomats
Austro-Hungarian diplomats of World War I
Austrian diplomats
Barons of Austria
Hungarian people of Italian descent
Romanian people of Italian descent
Austrian people of Italian descent
Austrian people of Hungarian descent
People from Sibiu